Female hysteria was once a common medical diagnosis for women, which was described as exhibiting a wide array of symptoms, including anxiety, shortness of breath, fainting, nervousness, sexual desire, insomnia, fluid retention, heaviness in the abdomen, irritability, loss of appetite for food or sex, (paradoxically) sexually forward behaviour, and a "tendency to cause trouble for others". It is no longer recognized by medical authorities as a medical disorder. Its diagnosis and treatment were routine for hundreds of years in Western Europe.

In Western medicine, hysteria was considered both common and chronic among women. Even though it was categorized as a disease, hysteria's symptoms were synonymous with normal functioning female sexuality. In extreme cases, the woman may have been forced to enter an insane asylum or to have undergone surgical hysterectomy.

Early history

The history of hysteria can be traced to ancient times. Dating back to 1900 BC in ancient Egypt, the first descriptions of hysteria within the female body were found recorded on the Kahun Papyri. In this culture, the womb was thought capable of affecting much of the rest of the body, but "there is no warrant for the fanciful view that the ancient Egyptians believed that a variety of bodily complaints were due to an animate, wandering womb". Uterine prolapse was also known.

In ancient Greece, wandering womb was described in the gynecological treatise of the Hippocratic Corpus, "Diseases of Women", which dates back to the 5th and 4th centuries BC. Plato's dialogue Timaeus compares a woman's uterus to a living creature that wanders throughout a woman's body, "blocking passages, obstructing breathing, and causing disease". Aretaeus of Cappadocia described the uterus as "an animal within an animal" (less emotively, "a living thing inside a living thing"), which causes symptoms by wandering around a woman's body putting pressure on other organs. Timaeus also argued that the uterus is "sad and unfortunate" when it does not join with a male or bear child. The standard cure for this "hysterical suffocation" was scent therapy, in which good smells were placed under a woman's genitals and bad odors at the nose, while sneezing could be also induced to drive the uterus back to its correct place. The concept of a pathological "wandering womb" was later viewed as the source of the term hysteria, which stems from the Greek cognate of uterus, ὑστέρα (hystera), although the word hysteria does not feature in ancient Greek medicine: 'the noun is not used in this period'.

While in the Hippocratic texts a wide range of women were susceptible – including in particular the childless – Galen in the 2nd century omitted the childless and saw the most vulnerable group as "widows, and particularly those who previously menstruated regularly, had been pregnant and were eager to have intercourse, but were now deprived of all this" (On the Affected Parts, 6.5). He also denied that the womb could "move from one place to another like a wandering animal". His treatments included scent therapy and sexual intercourse, but also rubbing in ointments to the external genitalia; this was to be performed by midwives, not physicians.

While most Hippocratic writers saw the retention of menstrual blood in the womb as a key problem, for Galen even more serious was the retention of "female seed". This was believed to be thinner than male seed and could be retained in the womb. Hysteria was referred to as "the widow's disease", because the female semen was believed to turn venomous if not released through regular climax or intercourse. If the patient was married, this could be completed by intercourse with their spouse. Other than participating in sexual intercourse, it was thought that fumigating the body with special fragrances would supposedly draw the uterus back to its natural spot in the female body. Foul smells applied to the nose would drive it down, and pleasant scents at the vulva would attract it.

Middle Ages, Renaissance, and the early modern period 

Through the Middle Ages, another cause of dramatic symptoms could be found: demonic possession. It was thought that demoniacal forces were attracted to those who were prone to melancholy, particularly to single women and the elderly. When a patient could not be diagnosed or cured of a disease, it was thought that the symptoms of what would now be diagnosed as mental illness, were actually those of someone possessed by the devil. After the 17th century, the correlation of demonic possession and hysteria were gradually discarded and instead was described as behavioral deviance, a medical issue.

In the 16th and 17th centuries, hysteria was still believed to be due to the retention of humour or fluids in the uterus, sexual deprivation, or by the tendency of the uterus to wander around the female body causing irritability and suffocation. Self-treatment such as masturbation, was not recommended and was also considered taboo. Marriage, and regular sexual encounters with her husband, was still the most highly recommended long-term course of treatment for a woman with hysteria. It was thought to purge the uterus of any built-up fluid, and semen was thought to have healing properties, In this model, ejaculation outside the vagina was conducive to uterine disease since the female genitalia did not receive the health benefits of male emission. Some physicians regarded all contraceptive practices as injurious to women for this reason. Giovanni Matteo Ferrari da Gradi cited marriage and childbearing as a cure for the disease. If pleasure was obtained from them, then hysteria could be cured. If a woman was unmarried, or widowed, manual stimulation by a midwife involving certain oils and scents was recommended to purge the uterus of any fluid retention. Lack of marriage was also thought to be the cause of most melancholy in single women, such as nuns or widows. Studies of the causes and effects of hysteria were continued in the 16th and 17th century by medical professionals such as Ambroise Pare, Thomas Sydenham, and Abraham Zacuto, who published their findings furthering medical knowledge of the disease, and informing treatment. Physician Abraham Zacuto writes in his Praxis Medica Admiranda from 1637,

There was continued debate about whether it was morally acceptable for a physician to remove excess female seed through genital manipulation of the female patient; Pieter van Foreest (Forestus) and Giovanni Matteo da Grado (Gradus) insisted on using midwives as intermediaries, and regarded the treatment as the last resort.

18th century 
In the 18th century, hysteria slowly became associated with mechanisms in the brain rather than the uterus. This is also when it was noted both men and women could contract hysteria. French physician Philippe Pinel freed hysteria patients detained in Paris' Salpêtrière sanatorium on the basis that kindness and sensitivity were needed to formulate good care. Another French physician, Francois de Sauvages de La Croix believed some common signs of female hysteria were "tears and laughter, oscitation [yawning], pandiculation (stretching and yawning), suffocating angina (chest pain) or dyspnea (shortness of breath), dysphagia (difficulty swallowing), delirium, a close and driving pulse, a swollen abdomen, cold extremities, and abundant and clear urine."

19th century
Jean-Martin Charcot argued that hysteria derived from a neurological disorder and showed that it was more common in men than women. Charcot's theories of hysteria being a physical condition of the mind and not of the body led to a more scientific and analytical approach to hysteria in the 19th century. He dispelled the beliefs that hysteria had anything to do with the supernatural and attempted to define it medically. Charcot's use of photography, and the resulting concretization of women's expressions of health and distress, continued to influence women's experiences of seeking healthcare. Though older ideas persisted during this era, over time female hysteria began to be thought of less as a physical ailment and more of a psychological one.

George Beard, a physician who cataloged an incomplete list including 75 pages of possible symptoms of hysteria, claimed that almost any ailment could fit the diagnosis. Physicians thought that the stress associated with the typical female life at the time caused civilized women to be both more susceptible to nervous disorders and to develop faulty reproductive tracts. One American physician expressed pleasure in the fact that the country was "catching up" to Europe in the prevalence of hysteria.

According to Pierre Roussel and Jean-Jacques Rousseau, femininity was a natural and essential desire for women: "Femininity is for both authors an essential nature, with defined functions, and the disease is explained by the non-fulfillment of natural desire." It was during the industrial revolution and the major development of cities and modern lifestyles that disruption of this natural appetite was thought to cause lethargy or melancholy, leading to hysteria. At the time female patients sought medical practitioners for the massage treatment of hysteria. The rate of hysteria was so great in the socially restrictive industrial period that women were prone to carry smelling salts about their person in case they swooned, reminiscent of Hippocrates' theory of using odors to coerce the uterus back into place. For physicians, manual massage treatment was becoming laborious and time-consuming, and they were seeking a way to increase productivity.

Rachel Maines hypothesized that physicians from the classical era until the early 20th century commonly treated hysteria by manually stimulating the genitals of, i. e. masturbating, female patients to the point of orgasm, which was denominated "hysterical paroxysm", and that the inconvenience of this may have motivated the original development of and market for the vibrator. Other hysteria treatments included pregnancy, marriage, heterosexual sex, and the application of smelling oils on female genitals. Although Maines's theory that hysteria was treated by masturbating female patients to orgasm is widely repeated in the literature on female anatomy and sexuality, some historians dispute Maines's claims regarding the prevalence of this treatment for hysteria and its relevance to the invention of the vibrator, describing them as a distortion of the evidence or that they are only relevant to a very small group. In 2018, Hallie Lieberman and Eric Schatzberg of Georgia Institute of Technology challenged Maines's claims for the use of electromechanical vibrators to treat hysteria in the 19th century. Maines stated that her theory of the prevalence of masturbation for hysteria and its relevance to the invention of the vibrator is a hypothesis and not proven fact.

Frederick Hollick was a firm believer that a main cause of hysteria was licentiousness present in women.

Freud and decline of diagnosis

During the early 20th century, the number of women diagnosed with female hysteria sharply declined. This decline has been attributed to many factors. Some medical authors claim that the decline was due to gaining a greater understanding of the psychology behind conversion disorders such as hysteria.

With so many possible symptoms, historically hysteria was considered a catchall diagnosis where any unidentifiable ailment could be assigned. As diagnostic techniques improved, the number of ambiguous cases that might have been attributed to hysteria declined. For instance, before the introduction of electroencephalography, epilepsy was frequently confused with hysteria.

Sigmund Freud claimed that hysteria was not anything physical at all but an emotional, internal condition that could affect both males and females, which was caused by previous trauma that led to the affected being unable to enjoy sex in the normal way. This would later lead to Freud's development of the Oedipus complex, which connotes femininity as a failure, or lack of masculinity. Although these earlier studies had shown that men were also prone to have hysteria, including Freud himself, over time, the condition was related mainly to issues of femininity as the continued study of hysteria took place only in women. Many cases that had previously been labeled hysteria were reclassified by Freud as anxiety neuroses.  Sigmund Freud was fascinated by cases of hysteria. He thought that hysteria may have been related to the unconscious mind and separate from the conscious mind or the ego. He was convinced that deep conflicts in the mind, some concerning instinctual drives for sex and aggression, were driving the behavior of those with hysteria. Freud developed psychoanalysis in order to help patients that had been diagnosed with hysteria reduce internal conflicts causing physical and emotional suffering.  While hysteria was reframed with reference to new laws and was new in principle, its recommended treatment in psychoanalysis would remain what Bernheimer observes it had been for centuries: marrying and having babies and in this way regaining the "lost" phallus.

New theories relating to hysteria came from pure speculation; doctors and physicians could not connect symptoms to the disorder, causing it to decline rapidly as a diagnosis.

Today, female hysteria is no longer a recognized illness, but different manifestations of hysteria are recognized in other conditions such as schizophrenia, borderline personality disorder, conversion disorder, and anxiety attacks.

Relationship with women's rights and feminism
The most vehement negative statements associating feminism with hysteria came during the militant suffrage campaign.
The American Psychiatric Association did not drop the term "hysteria" until the 1950s. By the 1980s, feminists began to reclaim hysteria, using it as a symbol of the systematic oppression of women and reclaiming the term for themselves. Especially among sex-positive feminists, who believe sexual repression and having it called hysteria is a form of oppression. The idea stemmed from the belief that Hysteria was a kind of pre-feminist rebellion against the oppressive defined social roles placed upon women. Feminist writers such as Catherine Clément and Hélène Cixous wrote in The Newly Born Woman from a place of opposition to the theories proposed in psychoanalytical works, pushing against the notion that socially constructed femininities and hysteria are natural to being female. Feminist social historians of both genders argue that hysteria is caused by women's oppressed social roles, rather than by their bodies or psyches, and they have sought its sources in cultural myths of femininity and in male domination.

See also 

 Hysterical contagion
 Male hysteria
 Mass hysteria
 Mass psychogenic illness
 Premenstrual dysphoric disorder
 Vapours

References

Further reading 
 Kapsalis, Terri (2008). The Hysterical Alphabet. WhiteWalls. .

External links 
 Erika Kinetz, "Is Hysteria Real? Brain Images Say Yes" (The New York Times)
 Female Hysteria during Victorian Era

Anxiety
Chauvinism
Hysteria,Female
Human sexuality
Misogyny
Obsolete medical theories
Pejorative terms for women
Pseudoscience
Freudian psychology
Social problems in medicine
Stereotypes of women
Uterus